Yudong  is a station on Line 3 of Chongqing Rail Transit in Chongqing Municipality, China, which opened in 2012 with the opening of Line 3 Southern Extension. Line 2 also reached this station with the opening of the Southern Extension in 2014. It is located in Banan District.

Station structure

References

Railway stations in Chongqing
Railway stations in China opened in 2012
Chongqing Rail Transit stations